Municipality elections were held in Norway in 1919.

Result of municipal elections
Results of the 1919 municipal elections. Results can only be given separately by rural areas and cities.

Cities

Rural areas

References

Local elections in Norway
1910s elections in Norway
Norway
Local